The Pamantasan ng Lungsod ng Maynila (University of the City of Manila) may refer to different educational institutions, such as:

Pamantasan ng Lungsod ng Maynila System
 Pamantasan ng Lungsod ng Maynila, Intramuros
 Pamantasan ng Lungsod ng Maynila, District Colleges
 Pamantasan ng Lungsod ng Maynila, Open University

Other unrelated institutions with the name "Manila University" on their titles
 Ateneo de Manila University
 Manila Central University
 Universidad de Manila
 University of Manila

See also
 Pamantasan